Dattaji Salvi (1918-2002) was a leader of Shiv Sena and a trade unionist. He was a member of Maharashtra Legislative Council and was minister of home and labour in the ministry headed by Manohar Joshi. He died in 2002.

References

Shiv Sena politicians
2002 deaths
Trade unionists from Maharashtra
Politicians from Mumbai
1918 births
Members of the Maharashtra Legislative Council
Marathi politicians